Unadilla Valley Central School is a public school operating in New Berlin, Chenango County, New York. 
Colors, Purple, Gold, Black 

Schools in New York (state)
Schools in Chenango County, New York